Tamami Ono (born November 21, 1989, in Chiba, Japan) is a Japanese figure skater who competed for Hong Kong during her entire career. She is the 2005 & 2006 Hong Kong national champion and 2004 junior national champion. She qualified to the free skate at the 2008 and 2009 Four Continents Championships.

References

External links
 Profile at the Hong Kong Skating Union

Hong Kong female single skaters
Japanese female single skaters
Living people
1989 births
Hong Kong people of Japanese descent
Sportspeople from Chiba Prefecture